Daniel Nacevski (born August 6, 1995) is a Macedonian professional basketball Guard who currently plays for Pelister in the Macedonian First League.

External links
 at Eurobasket
 at FIBA
 at Balkanleague
 at RealGM
 at BGBasket

References

1995 births
Sportspeople from Štip
Macedonian men's basketball players
Living people
Guards (basketball)